The 1990 Volvo U.S. National Indoor (known as such in 1990 for sponsorship reasons) was a tennis tournament played on indoor carpet courts. It was the 20th edition of the event known that year as the Volvo U.S. National Indoor, and was part of the ATP World Series of the 1990 ATP Tour. It took place in Memphis, Tennessee, United States, from February 26 to March 4, 1990. Unseeded Michael Stich won the singles title.

Finals

Singles

 Michael Stich defeated  Wally Masur, 6–7(5–7), 6–4, 7–6(7–1)
It was Stich's first singles title of his career.

Doubles

 Darren Cahill /  Mark Kratzmann defeated  Udo Riglewski /  Michael Stich, 7–5, 6–2
It was Cahill's first title of the year, and the 10th of his career. It was Kratzmann's second title of the year, and the 10th of his career.

References

External links
 ITF tournament edition details

 
U.S. National Indoor Championships
Volvo U.S. National
Volvo U.S. National
Volvo U.S. National Indoor
Volvo U.S. National Indoor